Wala may be:

Langalanga language of the Solomon Islands
Uripiv language of Vanuatu
Dagaari Dioula language of Burkina Faso